Kyogle railway station is located on the North Coast line in New South Wales, Australia. Opened on 25 June 1910, it serves the town of Kyogle. It served as the terminus of the line until it was extended to South Brisbane in September 1930.

Platforms & services
Kyogle has one platform. Each day the station is served by a northbound XPT service to Brisbane and a southbound service to Sydney. This station is a request stop, so the train stops only if passengers booked to board/alight here.

References

External links
Kyogle station details Transport for New South Wales

Easy Access railway stations in New South Wales
Railway stations in Australia opened in 1910
Regional railway stations in New South Wales
Kyogle Council
North Coast railway line, New South Wales